

General Facts
 
Priatelia Zeme Slovensko (Slovak, translated to English as Friends of the Earth Slovakia)  became a Friends of the Earth International member in 1997. Since then, they have been actively participating in activities coordinated by Friends of the Earth International and its regional association, Friends of the Earth Europe.

Friends of the Earth Slovakia consists of three organisations at present: Friends of the Earth-CEPA, Friends of the Earth - SPZ and WOLF Forest Protection Movement.

Objective
 
Ensure environmental, social and economical justice as well as protection of nature, living environment and the quality of life.

External links 
 http://www.priateliazeme.sk
Environmental organisations based in Slovakia